Youngiibacter multivorans is a Gram-negative bacterium from the genus of Youngiibacter.

References

Clostridiaceae
Bacteria described in 1992
Bacillota